Hubo or HUBO may refer to:
 HUBO, a walking humanoid robot developed by the Korea Advanced Institute of Science and Technology
 Hubo Netherlands, a Dutch hardware store chain
 Hubo Belgium, a Belgian hardware store chain
 Hubometer, an axle-mounted distance measuring device